Perungulam is an ancient panchayat town in Thoothukudi district in the Indian state of Tamil Nadu.

Demographics
As of the 2001 India census, Perungulam had a population of 6,451. Males constitute 49% of the population and females 51%. Perungulam has an average literacy rate of 77%, higher than the national average of 59.5%: male literacy is 81%, and female literacy is 74%. 12% of the population is under 6 years of age.

Geography 
The big pond in this village is named Perungulam. The city is surrounded by paddies, reservoirs, streams and vegetation.

Landmark

Srinivasa Perumal Temple
Sri Mayakoothar Temple - Thirukkulandhai, Perunkulam is one of the Nava Tirupathi, nine Hindu temples dedicated to Lord Vishnu located along the Tiruchendur-Tirunelveli route, on the banks of Thamiraparani river. These temples are classified as "Divya Desams", the 108 temples of Vishnu revered by the 12 poet saints, or Alwars.

References

External links 

 [www.mayakoothar.com Mayakoothar]

Cities and towns in Thoothukudi district